One Kill Wonder is the third studio album by Swedish metal band The Haunted. It was released on 17 February 2003.

The writing for this album began around 2 September 2001.

"D.O.A." served as the album's only single. It was accompanied by a music video which found limited television airing due to its graphic nature. The song is also available as a downloadable song in the video game Rock Band.

Marco Aro left the band after this record. However, he would later return to record vocals for The Haunted's 2014 studio album Exit Wounds.

Track listing

Credits 
The Haunted
Marco Aro – vocals
Anders Björler – lead guitar
Patrik Jensen – rhythm guitar
Jonas Björler – bass
Per Möller Jensen – drums

Guest musician
Michael Amott – guitar solo on "Bloodletting"

References 

2003 albums
The Haunted (Swedish band) albums
Albums produced by Fredrik Nordström
Earache Records albums